"(Until) Your Love Broke Through" is a song recorded by American-Australian singer Marcia Hines. The song was written by Keith Green, Randy Stonehill and Todd Fishkind and produced by Robie Porter and released in December 1976 as the third single from Hines' second studio album, Shining (1976).

Track listing
 7" Single (MS-502)
Side A "(Until) Your Love Broke Through" (Keith Green, Randy Stonehill & Todd Fishkind) – 3:15
Side B "Whatever Goes Around"	(Al Sharp) – 2:56

Charts

Other versions 

 Phil Keaggy recorded the song on his 1977 album, Love Broke Thru and later on the live album, How the West was One (1977).
 Keith Green recorded it on his debut album, For Him Who Has Ears to Hear (1977).
 Debby Boone recorded it on her debut album, You Light Up My Life (1977).
 Randy Stonehill recorded the song, with an additional verse, for his album, Love Beyond Reason (1985).
 Russ Taff covered the song for a Keith Green tribute album, No Compromise: Remembering The Music Of Keith Green (1993).
 Rebecca St. James covered the song for a Keith Green tribute album, Your Love Broke Through: The Worship Songs of Keith Green (2002). That recording was also released on the compilation album, Wait for Me: The Best from Rebecca St. James (2003).
 The Katinas recorded the song in their album Timeless (2005).

References

Marcia Hines songs
Debby Boone songs
1976 songs
1976 singles